Thanakorn Thong-in is a professional footballer from Thailand. He currently plays for Nakhon Pathom in the Thailand Premier League.

References
 Official team website

Living people
Thanakorn Thong-in
1981 births
Thanakorn Thong-in
Thanakorn Thong-in
Association football goalkeepers